Michael Thompson is an American photographer who began his career as an assistant to Irving Penn after training at the Brooks Institute of Photography in California. His father was a studio photographer in Washington State. Thompson's photography has appeared in W, Details, Allure, Harper's Bazaar, Vogue, Vanity Fair, GQ and The New York Times Magazine. His commercial photography includes campaigns for Gap, Elizabeth Arden, Chanel, and the PDN Award winner "I Am African." His commercials include those for the fragrance "Lovely" by Sarah Jessica Parker (winner of the 2006 FiFi Award for Best National Advertising Campaign -Television), the "Frank Gehry Collection" for Tiffany, and a PSA for "The American Ballet Theatre."

Thompson lives and works in New York.

Books 
 Images  Publisher: Harry N. Abrams (February 1, 2005)
 Portraits
 Red Nude

References

External links 
 Digital Photo Pro article
 JedRoot bio

Living people
Fashion photographers
Brooks Institute alumni
Year of birth missing (living people)